Pesquera can refer to


Places
Pesquera, Cantabria, Spain
La Pesquera, Cuenca, Spain
Pesquera de Duero in the province of Valladolid, Spain
Villa Pesquera, Puerto Rico

People

Surnname
Carlos Pesquera (born 1956), Puerto Rican civil engineer
Diego de Pesquera, 16th-century Spanish sculptor
José Lorenzo Pesquera (1882–1950), Resident Commissioner of Puerto Rico
Héctor Pesquera, Secretary of Public Safety of Puerto Rico
Hernan Gregorio Pesquera (1924–1982), Puerto Rican judge

See also
Pesqueira (disambiguation)
Pesquería